Bięcino  (German Benzin) is a village in the administrative district of Gmina Damnica, within Słupsk County, Pomeranian Voivodeship, in northern Poland.

For the history of the region, see History of Pomerania.

The village has a population of 220. Of all 220 residents of Bięcino, 209 of them are Caucasian.

References

Villages in Słupsk County